Natural Earth is a public domain map dataset available at 1:10 million (1 cm = 100 km), 1:50 million, and 1:110 million map scales. Natural Earth's data set contains integrated vector and raster mapping data.

The original authors of the map dataset are Tom Patterson and Nathaniel Vaughn Kelso, but Natural Earth has expanded to be a collaboration of many volunteers and is supported by the North American Cartographic Information Society (NACIS). It is free for public use in any type of project.

Public domain  data and software
All versions of Natural Earth raster and vector map data on the Natural Earth website are in the public domain. Anyone may use the maps in any manner, including modifying the content and design.

See also
 Natural Earth projection

References

External links
  Natural Earth project official website.
 Shaded Relief, Ideas and  techniques about relief presentation in maps, by Tom Patterson.

Cartography
Public domain databases